Neosilurus hyrtlii, commonly known as Hyrtl's catfish or Glencoe tandan, is a species of catfish found across northern Australia, from the Pilbara to southeastern Queensland.

Taxonomy
Neosilurus hyrtlii has been given many common names, including common eel-tail catfish, Glencoe tandan, Hyrtl's tandan, inland catfish, moonfish, moony, Morton's tandan, mottled tandan, salmon catfish, silver moonfish, straight-backed catfish, white tandan, yellow fin tandan and yellow-finned catfish.

Austrian naturalist Franz Steindachner described the species in 1867, from the Fitzroy River in Queensland.

Description
Fish of up to  have been recorded from the Alligator River. Female fish are a little larger than male fish.

The head is wide and mildly flattened with four pairs of barbels. It has a sturdy dorsal spine, the inside edge of which is serrated. Large fish are dark brown or grey above fading to whitish below with dark brown to black (or rarely yellow) fins. The male and female have silver flanks and yellow fins during spawning.

Distribution and habitat
Neosilurus hyrtlii is found across northern Australia, from the Ashburton River in the Pilbara in Western Australia, through the Kimberley, where it is found in most rivers, and across the Northern Territory and into the river systems that drain into the Gulf of Carpentaria in Queensland. In inland Australia, it has been recorded from the Diamantina, Georgina, Cooper, Bulloo and Finke Rivers. It is abundant in rivers on the western side of Cape York, though less common on the east coast. It is found down the east coast as far as the Mary River in southeastern Queensland, as well as Fraser Island.

Feeding
Like most catfish, N. hyrtlii is mainly benthic, that is, feeding on or in the river floor. Its prey is small considering its size, comprising small molluscs (both bivalves and gastropods), crustaceans, detritus, mayfly nymphs and caddisfly larvae and midge larvae.

Ecology
Natural predators of N. hyrtlii include the barramundi, fork-tailed catfish and tarpon.

References

External links

hyrtlii
Freshwater fish of Australia
Endemic fauna of Australia
Venomous fish
Fish described in 1867
Taxa named by Franz Steindachner